Dave Benton (born 31 January 1951, birth name Efrén Eugene Benita) is a pop musician from Aruba who lives in Estonia. He is one of the winners of the Eurovision Song Contest 2001. At the age of 50 years and 101 days at the time of his victory, Benton is the oldest singer ever to win Eurovision.

Biography
Born Efrén Eugene Benita in 1951 on the Caribbean island of Aruba, he went to local schools. He was fluent in English, Dutch, Spanish and Papiamento, the creole language of the island. He married and had a daughter. In his 20s, he separated from his wife and moved to the United States. As a drummer and a backing vocalist, he worked with The Drifters, Tom Jones, Billy Ocean, José Feliciano and The Platters.

While living in the Netherlands in the 1980s, he met his future wife Maris, an Estonian, on a cruise ship. They settled in Estonia in 1997 and had two daughters. Benton's daughter Sissi participated in Eesti Laul in 2021 with the song "Time", attempting to follow in her father's footsteps and represent Estonia in the Eurovision Song Contest 2021. She qualified to the superfinal, where she placed second.

Benton has had a varied musical career in Northern European countries. He speaks eight languages: English, Spanish, Papiamento, Dutch, French, German, Portuguese, and Estonian. He performed in the German production of the musical City Lights, after which he was asked to replace Engelbert Humperdinck on his Australian tour.

Benton has released and produced quite a few albums already, one of which in his native tongue, Papiamento. He has had more of a career as a performing artist.
 
In 2001 he performed with budding Estonian rock singer Tanel Padar and boyband 2XL to win the Eurovision Song Contest 2001 with their song "Everybody".

Other information
 Benton was a contestant at the 1981 OTI Festival (Ibero-American equivalent of the Eurovision contest) held in Mexico City; he represented the Netherlands Antilles with the song "Vaya un amigo" as Efrén Benita. He finished in 20th place at this contest.
 Benton won the Eurovision Song Contest for Estonia, before he had learned to speak Estonian.
 In 2010, Benton participated as a celebrity contestant on the fourth season of Tantsud tähtedega, an Estonian version of Dancing with the Stars. His professional dancing partner was Valeria Fetissova.
 He is a grandfather.

References

External links

 Dave Benton at Yahoo! Music
 Dave Benton at Estonian Bands Database
 
 Aruba-born Dave Benton Joins with Tanel Padar for Top 2001 Eurovision Honors, Caribia Digest
 Dave Benton: 'I was asked in Estonia and Finland'
 Estonians record previews, Dave Benton is back!, Eurovision TV

1951 births
Living people
Aruban singers
Estonian pop singers
Eurovision Song Contest winners
Eurovision Song Contest entrants for Estonia
Eurovision Song Contest entrants of 2001
21st-century Estonian male singers
Dutch people of Aruban descent
Aruban emigrants to Estonia
Papiamento-language singers
People from Oranjestad, Aruba